Neurotheca is a genus of flowering plants belonging to the family Gentianaceae.

Its native range is Northern South America to Brazil, Tropical and Southern Africa, and Madagascar.

Species
Species:

Neurotheca congolana 
Neurotheca corymbosa 
Neurotheca loeselioides

References

Gentianaceae
Gentianaceae genera